The enzyme 2-dehydro-3-deoxy-D-pentonate aldolase catalyzes the chemical reaction

2-dehydro-3-deoxy-Dpentonate  pyruvate + glycolaldehyde

This enzyme belongs to the family of lyases, specifically the aldehyde-lyases, which cleave carbon-carbon bonds.  The systematic name of this enzyme class is 2-dehydro-3-deoxy-D-pentonate glycolaldehyde-lyase (pyruvate-forming). Other names in common use include 2-keto-3-deoxy-D-pentonate aldolase, 3-deoxy-D-pentulosonic acid aldolase, and 2-dehydro-3-deoxy-D-pentonate glycolaldehyde-lyase.  This enzyme participates in pentose and glucuronate interconversions.

References

 
 

EC 4.1.2
Enzymes of unknown structure